Guthrie Township is one of nine townships in Lawrence County, Indiana, United States. As of the 2010 census, its population was 1,383 and it contained 654 housing units.

History
Guthrie Township was established in the early 1860s. Guthrie was the surname of a family of pioneer settlers.

The Clampitt Site was listed in the National Register of Historic Places in 2016.

Geography
The township's southern border is defined by the East Fork White River.

Unincorporated towns
 Buddha at 
 Fort Ritner at 
 Leesville at 
 Pinhook at 
 Tunnelton at 
(This list is based on USGS data and may include former settlements.)

Cemeteries
The township contains these cemeteries: Carlton, Dodd, Johnston, and Pinhook.

Demographics

School districts
 North Lawrence Community Schools

Political districts
 Indiana's 4th congressional district
 State House District 65
 State Senate District 44

Organizations
Guthrie Township Volunteer Fire Department

References

External links
 Indiana Township Association
 United Township Association of Indiana
 City-Data.com page for Guthrie Township

Townships in Lawrence County, Indiana
Townships in Indiana